Greenup is a village in Cumberland County, Illinois, United States, along the Embarras River. The population was 1,365 at the 2020 census. It is part of the Charleston–Mattoon Micropolitan Statistical Area.

Greenup received its name from National Road surveyor, William C. Greenup who platted the town in 1834. He was one of the supervisors hired to oversee construction of the National Road in Illinois, surveying the original alignment from Marshall to Vandalia during the 1830s. The village of Greenup served as the Cumberland County seat from 1843 to 1857.

History
Greenup was platted in 1834, and served as Cumberland County's first county seat from 1843 to 1855.

Geography
Greenup is located southeast of the center of Cumberland County at  (39.247273, -88.162131). The Embarras River is a tributary of the Wabash River which runs past the northwest corner of the village. U.S. Route 40 runs through the village to the south of its center, while Interstate 70 runs through the northern corner of the village with access from Exit 119 (Illinois Route 130).

Demographics
As of the 2020 census there were 1,365 people, 735 households, and 381 families residing in the village. The racial makeup of the village was 93.26% White, 0.73% African American, 0.44% Native American, 0.22% Asian, 0.07% Pacific Islander, 0.37% from other races, and 4.91% from two or more races. Hispanic or Latino of any race were 1.54% of the population.

There were 735 households, out of which 55.78% had children under the age of 18 living with them, 44.49% were married couples living together, 4.90% had a female householder with no husband present, and 48.16% were non-families. 43.81% of all households were made up of individuals, and 26.80% had someone living alone who was 65 years of age or older. The average household size was 3.21 and the average family size was 2.33.

The village's age distribution consisted of 25.8% under the age of 18, 5.5% from 18 to 24, 26.4% from 25 to 44, 19.8% from 45 to 64, and 22.5% who were 65 years of age or older. The median age was 37.1 years. For every 100 females, there were 81.6 males. For every 100 females age 18 and over, there were 85.2 males.

The median income for a household in the village was $40,139, and the median income for a family was $72,598. Males had a median income of $47,143 versus $25,355 for females. The per capita income for the village was $22,561. About 7.1% of families and 14.8% of the population were below the poverty line, including 16.9% of those under age 18 and 9.9% of those age 65 or over.

Notable people 

 Lincoln Bancroft, Illinois state representative and mayor of Greenup.
 Abe ("Ab") Bowman, pitcher for the Cleveland Indians, born in Greenup.
 James A. Peters, PhD (University of Michigan), herpetologist, Curator at Smithsonian Institution, authored Dictionary of Herpetology (1964), grew up in Greenup, interred in Greenup Cemetery.
 Bobbi Trout, pioneer aviator, born in Greenup.
 Cy Warman, 19th century author; born and raised near Greenup.

References

External links
 Village of Greenup official website

Villages in Cumberland County, Illinois
Villages in Illinois
National Road
Charleston–Mattoon, IL Micropolitan Statistical Area
Populated places established in 1834
1834 establishments in Illinois